is a constituency of the House of Councillors in the Diet of Japan (national legislature). It consists of Gunma Prefecture and elects two Councillors, one per election.

Between 1947 and 2007 Gunma was represented by four Councillors, electing two at a time by single non-transferable vote. Like most two-member districts Gunma often split seats between the Liberal Democratic Party (LDP) and the Japan Socialist Party (JSP) despite being a conservative stronghold and home to the families of Prime Ministers Fukuda, Nakasone and Obuchi. Councillors from Gunma include Fukuda's brother Hiroichi and Nakasone's son Hirofumi.

Current Councillors 
As of 24 January 2023, the district is currently represented by 2 Councillors, both of the Liberal Democratic Party. They are, in order of election year:

 Masato Shimizu (LDP) - Class of 2019
 Hirofumi Nakasone (LDP) - Class of 2022

Elected Councillors

Election results

Elections in the 2020s

Elections in the 2010s

Elections in the 2000s

Elections in the 1990s

Elections in the 1980s 

s

Elections in the 1970s

Elections in the 1960s

Elections in the 1950s

Elections in the 1940s

References 

Districts of the House of Councillors (Japan)